The Entognatha are a class of wingless and ametabolous arthropods, which, together with the insects, makes up the subphylum Hexapoda. Their mouthparts are entognathous, meaning that they are retracted within the head, unlike the insects. Entognatha are apterous, meaning that they lack wings. The class contains three orders: Collembola (springtails, 9000 species), Diplura (“two-tail”, 1000 species) and Protura (“first-tail”, 800 species). These three groups were historically united with the now-obsolete order Thysanura to form the class Apterygota, but it has since been recognized that the hexapodous condition of these animals has evolved independently from that of insects, and independently within each order. The orders may not be closely related, and Entognatha is now considered to be a polyphyletic group.

Morphology
These minute arthropods are apterous, unlike some orders of insects that have lost their wings secondarily (but are derived from winged ancestors). Their mouthparts are enclosed within a pouch in the head capsule, called the gnathal pouch, so only the tips of the mandibles and maxillae are exposed beyond the cavity. This pouch is created in the embryo by a flap or lateral head sclerite near the mouth on each side of the head which fuses with the labium. Other differences with insects are that each antennal segment is musculated; in insects, only the two basal segments are. Sperm transfer is always indirect, and there is an ovipositor in the females. Of the three orders, only collembolans possess eyes; nevertheless, many collembolans are blind, and even when compound eyes are present, there are no more than eight ommatidia.

Collembolans have a ventral tube termed a collophore on the first abdominal segment. The collophore is involved in moisture absorption. On the third abdominal segment is the retinaculum that holds the furcula. The furcula is the "spring" for which the Collembola are given the name springtails.
Proturans, sometimes referred to as "coneheads", do not have eyes or antennae. They possess a telson and abdominal styli thought to be vestigial legs.
Diplurans have a pair of caudal cerci, from which their name, meaning "two-tailed", is derived. They also possess abdominal styli.

References

 
Arthropod classes